This page details Isidro Metapán records.

Honours

Domestic competitions 

Primera División
 Winner (10): Clausura 2007, Apertura 2008, Clausura 2009, Clausura 2010, Apertura 2010, Apertura 2011, Apertura 2012, Apertura 2013, Clausura 2014, Apertura 2014
Liga de Ascenso
 Winner (1): 2000–01

Player records

Appearances

Youngest
 Youngest first-team player – TBD, - years - days (v. TBD, TBD, TBD)
 Youngest first-team player in the First Division – TBD, - years - days (v. TBD, Premier League, TBD)
 Youngest first-team player in an Official Concacaf Competition – TBD, - years - days (v. TBD, TBD, TBD)

Oldest
 Oldest first-team player – TBD, - years - days (v. TBD, TBD, TBD)
 Oldest first-team player in the First Division - TBD, - years - days (v. TBD, TBD)
 Oldest first-team player in an Official Concacaf competition – TBD, - years - days (v. TBD, TBD, TBD)
 Oldest first-team debutant – TBD, - years - days (v. TBD, TBD, TBD)

Most Number of Appearances 

Competitive, professional matches only including substitution, number of appearances as a substitute appears in brackets.
Last updated - 

 Current player with most appearances – Milton Molina, 366 (18), as of 2010
 Most consecutive appearances – TBA, - (TBD – TBD)
 Most separate spells with the club - TBD, - (TBA)

Concacaf appearances
As of 16 November 2015 (october2011)

Goalscorers

In a season
 Most goals in a season – 14, Williams Reyes (-)
 Most League goals in a season – ?, TBD, (TBD)
 Most Primera Division goals in a season  14, Williams Reyes, (TBD)

In a single match
 Most goals in a single match – ?, TBD (v. TBD, TBD)
 Most goals in a single match at home – ?, TBD (v. TBD, TBD, date unknown)
 Most goals in a single First Division away match - 4 TBD (v. TBD, date Unknown)
 Most goals in a Concacaf competition match – 3 Nicolás Muñoz (v. Puerto Rico Islanders, CONCACAF Champions League, August 2, 2012) 
 Fastest recorded goal – ? seconds, TBD (v. TBD, TBD)
 Fastest recorded goal in a First Division Match – 24 seconds, Spaniard Gregori Diaz (v. C.D. Platense Municipal Zacatecoluca, 3 April 2022)

Youngest and oldest

 Youngest goalscorer – TBD, - years - days (v. TBD, TBD)
 Youngest goalscorer in the league – TBD, - years - days (v. TBD, TBD)
 Youngest goalscorer in a Concacaf Competition  – Edwin Sanchez, 21 years 156 days (v. Puerto Rico Islanders, 2011–12 CONCACAF Champions League Preliminary Round, July 27, 2011 )
 Youngest hat-trick scorer – TBD, - years - days (v. TBD, TBD)
 Oldest goalscorer – TBD, - years - days (v. TBD, TBD, TBD)
 Oldest goalscorer in a Concacaf Competition  – Elias Montes, 35 years 65 days (v. Houston Dynamo, 2009–10 CONCACAF Champions League Group Stage, October 21, 2009)

 Leading Scorers Last updated -Competitive, professional matches only, appearances including substitutes appear in brackets.Concacaf scorersAs of 21 October 2011 Club Records 
 Record Victory: 6-0 vs San Salvador F.C., October 27, 2007
 Record Defeat: 1-7 vs Alianza F.C., 22 March 2010
 Biggest Victory at home in a Primera Division game: 6-0 vs San Salvador F.C., October 27, 2007
 Biggest Defeat at home in a Primera Division game: 0-2 vs C.D. FAS, TBD, 2002 and  0-2 vs Firpo, TBD, 2002 and  0-2 vs Atlético Balboa, TBD, 2004
 Biggest Victory away in a Primera Division game: 3-0 vs Atlético Marte, TBD, 2003 and 4-1 vs San Salvador F.C., September 2, 2004
 Biggest Defeat away in a Primera Division game: 1-7 vs Alianza F.C., 2010
 Record Victory in a Concacaf Competition: 4-0 ( Home vs Los Angeles Galaxy, 24 October 2013)
 Record Defeat in a Concacaf Competition: 0-8 (twice; Away vs UNAM Pumas, 15 March 2012)
 Record High Attendance: 27,750 (v. Aguila, Apertura 2014,  December 2014)
 Record Attendance for a Primera Division Match: 27,750 (v. Aguila, Apertura 2014,  December 2014)
 Record Attendance for a Concacaf competition Match (Home): 4,000 (v. Santos Laguna, Concacaf Champions League, 25 August 2011)

Streaks
 Most Wins in a Row:
 Most Draws in a Row:
 Most Loses in a Row:
 Most games Undefeated: 23 ( to April 22, 2012)

International level
 As of 16 November 2015 Friendly matches not included. Games decided by penalty shootout are counted as ties.''

Record by competition (2007-2011)
Matches that went into a penalty kick shootout are counted as draws in this table.

References 

Metapan
Football in El Salvador